Pudong Library is a library in Shanghai, China. It provides access to resources such as newspapers, electronic books and research papers. The library offers approximately 3,900,000 resources. Average daily attendance is 6,000; In 2017, the library achieved its highest attendance of 30,000 in a single day. The library closed for renovation in 2018, and reopened on 1 January 2019.

Design 
Pudong Library has a hexagonal design. The building rises through eight floors, two underground and the remaining six above. Its external appearance gives the impression that the building is floating. The building has been referred to as a bar-code.
The atrium starts from the basement and goes to the top of the building.

Sky Gardens 
The interior features two symmetrical sky gardens.

Neighborhood 
Pudong Library is near the China Executive Leadership Academy and is located in Shanghai's new civilization circle with Pudong Political and Civilized Park.

Awards 

 "Universal Reading Demonstration Base", Library Society of China, 2013

See also 
 Libraries in China
 National Library of China
 Shanghai Library
 Guangzhou Library
 Chinese Library Classification

References 

Libraries in Shanghai
Pudong
2012 establishments in China
Libraries established in 2012